Allen Y. Chao is a Taiwanese-American businessman who founded Watson Pharmaceuticals and served as chief executive officer from 1984 to 2008 and chairman.

Born in Shanghai, he spent his childhood in Taiwan. Chao went to Taipei Medical College, where he graduated with a B.S. degree in pharmacy in 1967. After emigrating to the United States, Chao obtained an M.S. degree in Pharmaceutics from West Virginia University in 1970. He subsequently received a Ph.D. degree in Industrial and Physical Pharmacy from Purdue University in 1973. Chao, along with other members of the Chao family, contributed to the establishment of the Chao Family Comprehensive Cancer Center and the H.H. Chao Comprehensive Digestive Disease Center at the University of California, Irvine Medical Center, Irvine, California campus. Since their first gift to the university in 1995, Chao and his family have given nearly $30 million to the campus.

In 2005, Chao contributed to the establishment of The Chao Center for Industrial Pharmacy, located in the Purdue Research Park in Indiana, to provide leadership in pharmaceutical education, development and manufacturing. Currently, he serves as chairman and managing partner of Newport Healthcare Advisors LLC. He is also a trustee of the University of California, Irvine Foundation.

In May 2000, Chao received an honorary D.Sc. degree from Purdue University in recognition of his leadership and vision for the production and marketing of pharmaceutical products.

References

Living people
American health care chief executives
Businesspeople in the pharmaceutical industry
Purdue University College of Pharmacy alumni
Taiwanese emigrants to the United States
1944 births